The Roman historian and senator Tacitus referred to Jesus, his execution by Pontius Pilate, and the existence of early Christians in Rome in his final work, Annals (written ca. AD 116), book 15, chapter 44.

The context of the passage is the six-day Great Fire of Rome that burned much of the city in AD 64 during the reign of Roman Emperor Nero. The passage is one of the earliest non-Christian references to the origins of Christianity, the execution of Christ described in the canonical gospels, and the presence and persecution of Christians in 1st-century Rome.

The scholarly consensus is that Tacitus' reference to the execution of Jesus by Pontius Pilate is both authentic, and of historical value as an independent Roman source. Paul Eddy and Gregory Boyd argue that it is "firmly established" that Tacitus provides a non-Christian confirmation of the crucifixion of Jesus. Scholars view it as establishing three separate facts about Rome around AD 60: (i) that there were a sizable number of Christians in Rome at the time, (ii) that it was possible to distinguish between Christians and Jews in Rome, and (iii) that at the time pagans made a connection between Christianity in Rome and its origin in Roman Judea.

The passage and its context

The Annals passage (15.44), which has been subjected to much scholarly analysis, follows a description of the six-day Great Fire of Rome that burned much of Rome in July 64 AD. The key part of the passage reads as follows (translation from Latin by A. J. Church and W. J. Brodribb, 1876):

Tacitus then describes the torture of Christians:
 
The exact cause of the fire remains uncertain, but much of the population of Rome suspected that Emperor Nero had started the fire himself. To divert attention from himself, Nero accused the Christians of starting the fire and persecuted them, making this the first documented confrontation between Christians and the authorities in Rome. Tacitus suggested that Nero used the Christians as scapegoats.

No original manuscripts of the Annals exist and the surviving copies of Tacitus' works derive from two principal manuscripts, known as the Medicean manuscripts, written in Latin, which are held in the Laurentian Library in Florence, Italy. It is the second Medicean manuscript, 11th century and from the Benedictine abbey at Monte Cassino, which is the oldest surviving copy of the passage describing Christians. Scholars generally agree that these copies were written at Monte Cassino and the end of the document refers to Abbas Raynaldus cu... who was most probably one of the two abbots of that name at the abbey during that period.

Specific references

Christians and Chrestians

The passage states:

In 1902 Georg Andresen commented on the appearance of the first 'i' and subsequent gap in the earliest extant, 11th century, copy of the Annals in Florence, suggesting that the text had been altered, and an 'e' had originally been in the text, rather than this 'i'. "With ultra-violet examination of the MS the alteration was conclusively shown. It is impossible today to say who altered the letter e into an i. In Suetonius' Nero 16.2, '', however, seems to be the original reading". Since the alteration became known it has given rise to debates among scholars as to whether Tacitus deliberately used the term "Chrestians", or if a scribe made an error during the Middle Ages. It has been stated that both the terms Christians and Chrestians had at times been used by the general population in Rome to refer to early Christians. Robert E. Van Voorst states that many sources indicate that the term Chrestians was also used among the early followers of Jesus by the second century. The term Christians appears only three times in the New Testament, the first usage (Acts 11:26) giving the origin of the term. In all three cases the uncorrected Codex Sinaiticus in Greek reads Chrestianoi. In Phrygia a number of funerary stone inscriptions use the term Chrestians, with one stone inscription using both terms together, reading: "Chrestians for Christians".

Adolf von Harnack argued that Chrestians was the original wording, and that Tacitus deliberately used Christus immediately after it to show his own superior knowledge compared to the population at large. Robert Renehan has stated that it was natural for a Roman to mix the two words that sounded the same, that Chrestianos was the original word in the Annals and not an error by a scribe. Van Voorst has stated that it was unlikely for Tacitus himself to refer to Christians as Chrestianos i.e. "useful ones" given that he also referred to them as "hated for their shameful acts". Eddy and Boyd see no major impact on the authenticity of the passage or its meaning regardless of the use of either term by Tacitus.

The rank of Pilate

Pilate's rank while he was governor of Judaea appeared in a Latin inscription on the Pilate Stone which called him a prefect, while this Tacitean passage calls him a procurator. Josephus refers to Pilate with the generic Greek term , or governor. Tacitus records that Claudius was the ruler who gave procurators governing power. After Herod Agrippa's death in AD 44, when Judea reverted to direct Roman rule, Claudius gave procurators control over Judea.  

Various theories have been put forward to explain why Tacitus should use the term "procurator" when the archaeological evidence indicates that Pilate was a prefect. Jerry Vardaman theorizes that Pilate's title was changed during his stay in Judea and that the Pilate Stone dates from the early years of his administration. Baruch Lifshitz postulates that the inscription would originally have mentioned the title of "procurator" along with "prefect". L.A. Yelnitsky argues that the use of "procurator" in Annals 15.44.3 is a Christian interpolation. S.G.F. Brandon suggests that there is no real difference between the two ranks. John Dominic Crossan states that Tacitus "retrojected" the title procurator which was in use at the time of Claudius back onto Pilate who was called prefect in his own time. Bruce Chilton and Craig Evans as well as Van Voorst state that Tacitus apparently used the title procurator because it was more common at the time of his writing and that this variation in the use of the title should not be taken as evidence to doubt the correctness of the information Tacitus provides. Warren Carter states that, as the term "prefect" has a military connotation, while "procurator" is civilian, the use of either term may be appropriate for governors who have a range of military, administrative and fiscal responsibilities.

Louis Feldman says that Philo (who died AD 50) and Josephus also use the term "procurator" for Pilate. As both Philo and Josephus wrote in Greek, neither of them actually used the term "procurator", but the Greek word , which is regularly translated as "procurator". Philo also uses this Greek term for the governors of Egypt (a prefect), of Asia (a proconsul) and Syria (a legate). Werner Eck, in his list of terms for governors of Judea found in the works of Josephus, shows that, while in the early work, The Jewish War, Josephus uses epitropos less consistently, the first governor to be referred to by the term in Antiquities of the Jews was Cuspius Fadus, (who was in office AD 44–46). Feldman notes that Philo, Josephus and Tacitus may have anachronistically confused the timing of the titles—prefect later changing to procurator. Feldman also notes that the use of the titles may not have been rigid, for Josephus refers to Cuspius Fadus both as "prefect" and "procurator".

Authenticity and historical value

Although its authenticity has sometimes been questioned, most scholars hold the passage to be authentic. William L. Portier has stated that the consistency in the references by Tacitus, Josephus and the letters to Emperor Trajan by Pliny the Younger reaffirm the validity of all three accounts. Scholars generally consider Tacitus's reference to be of historical value as an independent Roman source about early Christianity that is in unison with other historical records.

Tacitus was a patriotic Roman senator. His writings show no sympathy towards Christians, or knowledge of who their leader was. His characterization of "Christian abominations" may have been based on the rumors in Rome that during the Eucharist rituals Christians ate the body and drank the blood of their God, interpreting the ritual as cannibalism. Andreas Köstenberger states that the tone of the passage towards Christians is far too negative to have been authored by a Christian scribe. Van Voorst also states that the passage is unlikely to be a Christian forgery because of the pejorative language used to describe Christianity.

Tacitus was about seven years old at the time of the Great Fire of Rome, and like other Romans as he grew up he would have most likely heard about the fire that destroyed most of the city, and Nero's accusations against Christians. When Tacitus wrote his account, he was the  governor of the province of Asia, and as a member of the inner circle in Rome he would have known of the official position with respect to the fire and the Christians.

In 1885 P. Hochart had proposed that the passage was a pious fraud, but the editor of the 1907 Oxford edition dismissed his suggestion and treated the passage as genuine. Scholars such as Bruce Chilton, Craig Evans, Paul Eddy and Gregory Boyd agree with John Meier's statement that "Despite some feeble attempts to show that this text is a Christian interpolation in Tacitus, the passage is obviously genuine.”

Suggestions that the whole of Annals may have been a forgery have also been generally rejected by scholars. John P. Meier states that there is no historical or archaeological evidence to support the argument that a scribe may have introduced the passage into the text.<ref>{{cite book |last=Meier |first=John P. |title=[[John P. Meier#A Marginal Jew: Rethinking the Historical Jesus|A Marginal Jew: Rethinking the Historical Jesus]] |publisher=Doubleday |date=1991 |volume=1 |pages=168–171}}</ref>

Van Voorst states that "of all Roman writers, Tacitus gives us the most precise information about Christ". Crossan considers the passage important in establishing that Jesus existed and was crucified, and states: "That he was crucified is as sure as anything historical can ever be, since both Josephus and Tacitus... agree with the Christian accounts on at least that basic fact." Eddy and Boyd state that it is now "firmly established" that Tacitus provides a non-Christian confirmation of the crucifixion of Jesus. Biblical scholar Bart D. Ehrman wrote: "Tacitus's report confirms what we know from other sources, that Jesus was executed by order of the Roman governor of Judea, Pontius Pilate, sometime during Tiberius's reign."

James D. G. Dunn considers the passage as useful in establishing facts about early Christians, e.g. that there was a sizable number of Christians in Rome around AD 60. Dunn states that Tacitus seems to be under the impression that Christians were some form of Judaism, although distinguished from them. Raymond E. Brown and John P. Meier state that in addition to establishing that there was a large body of Christians in Rome, the Tacitus passage provides two other important pieces of historical information, namely that by around AD 60 it was possible to distinguish between Christians and Jews in Rome and that even pagans made a connection between Christianity in Rome and its origin in Judea.

Although the majority of scholars consider it to be genuine, some scholars question the value of the passage given that Tacitus was born 25 years after Jesus' death.

Some scholars have debated the historical value of the passage given that Tacitus does not reveal the source of his information. Gerd Theissen and Annette Merz argue that Tacitus at times had drawn on earlier historical works now lost to us, and he may have used official sources from a Roman archive in this case; however, if Tacitus had been copying from an official source, some scholars would expect him to have labelled Pilate correctly as a prefect rather than a procurator. Theissen and Merz state that Tacitus gives us a description of widespread prejudices about Christianity and a few precise details about "Christus" and Christianity, the source of which remains unclear. However, Paul Eddy has stated that given his position as a senator, Tacitus was also likely to have had access to official Roman documents of the time and did not need other sources.

Michael Martin states that the authenticity of this passage of the Annals has also been disputed on the grounds that Tacitus would not have used the name "Christos", derived from "messiah", while others have questioned if the passage represents "some modernizing or updating of the facts" to reflect the Christian world at the time the text was written.

Weaver notes that Tacitus spoke of the persecution of Christians, but no other Christian author wrote of this persecution for a hundred years. Brent Shaw has argued that Tacitus was relying on Christian and Jewish legendary sources that portrayed Nero as the Antichrist for the information that Nero persecuted Christians and that in fact, no persecution under Nero took place.

Shaw's views have received strong criticism and have generally not been accepted by the scholarly consensus: writing on New Testament Studies, Christopher P. Jones (Harvard University) answered to Shaw and refuted his arguments, noting that the Tacitus's anti-Christian stance makes it unlikely that he was using Christian sources; he also noted that the Epistle to the Romans of Paul the Apostle clearly points to the fact that there was indeed a clear and distinct Christian community in Rome in the 50s and that the persecution is also mentioned by Suetonius in The Twelve Caesars. Larry Hurtado was also critical of Shaw's argument, dismissing it as "vague and hazy".

Writing on Eirene: Studia Graeca et Latina, Brigit van der Lans and Jan N. Bremmer also dismissed Shaw's argument, noting that the Neronian persecution is recorded in many 1st-century Christian writings, such as the Epistle to the Hebrews, the Book of Revelation, the apocryphal Ascension of Isaiah, the First Epistle of Peter, the Gospel of John and the First Epistle of Clement; they also argued that Chrestianus, Christianus, and Χριστιανός were probably terms invented by the Romans in the 50s and then adopted by Christians themselves.

In an article for Vigiliae Christianae, John Granger Cook also rebuked Shaw's thesis, arguing that Chrestianus, Christianus, and Χριστιανός are not creations of the second century and that Roman officials were probably aware of the Chrestiani in the 60s.

In his book Ten Caesars: Roman Emperors from Augustus to Constantine, Barry S. Strauss rejects Shaw's argument.

Scholars have also debated the issue of hearsay in the reference by Tacitus. Charles Guignebert argued that "So long as there is that possibility [that Tacitus is merely echoing what Christians themselves were saying], the passage remains quite worthless". R. T. France states that the Tacitus passage is at best just Tacitus repeating what he had heard through Christians. However, Paul Eddy has stated that as Rome's preeminent historian, Tacitus was generally known for checking his sources and was not in the habit of reporting gossip. Tacitus was a member of the Quindecimviri sacris faciundis, a council of priests whose duty it was to supervise foreign religious cults in Rome, which as Van Voorst points out, makes it reasonable to suppose that he would have acquired knowledge of Christian origins through his work with that body.

Other early sources

The earliest known references to Christianity are found in Antiquities of the Jews, a 20-volume work written by the Jewish historian Titus Flavius Josephus around 93–94 AD, during the reign of emperor Domitian. This work includes two references to Jesus and Christians (in Book 18, Chapter 3 and Book 20, Chapter 9), and also a reference to John the Baptist (in Book 18, Chapter 5).

The next known reference to Christianity was written by Pliny the Younger, who was the Roman governor of Bithynia and Pontus during the reign of emperor Trajan. Around 111 AD, Pliny wrote a letter to emperor Trajan, requesting guidance on how to deal with suspected Christians who appeared before him in trials he was holding at that time. Tacitus' references to Nero's persecution of Christians in the Annals were written around 115 AD, a few years after Pliny's letter but also during the reign of emperor Trajan.

Another notable early author was Gaius Suetonius Tranquillus, who wrote the Lives of the Twelve Caesars around 122 AD, during the reign of emperor Hadrian. In this work, Suetonius described why Jewish Christians were expelled from Rome by emperor Claudius, and also the persecution of Christians by Nero, who was the heir and successor of Claudius.

See also

 Christianity in the 1st century
 Historicity of Jesus
 Mara bar Serapion on Jesus
 Sources for the historicity of Jesus

 References 

 Notes 

Further reading

 Tacitus and the Writing of History by Ronald H. Martin 1981 
 Tacitus' Annals'' by Ronald Mellor 2010 Oxford University Press, 

Christ, Tacitus on
Ancient Roman writers on Jesus
Pontius Pilate
Senators of the Roman Empire